Kim Kum-il (born 10 October 1987) is a North Korean footballer. He plays for the 4.25 Sports Team.

In 2006, Kim led the North Korean Under-20 team to win the AFC Youth Championship by scoring 4 goals, he was also voted as the Most Valuable Player of the tournament. The following 2007 FIFA World Youth Championship Kim participated as Captain of the North Korean team and scored one goal at the 2–2 draw with the Czech Republic.

Kim made his debut for the national team during the 2005 East Asian Football Championship in Taipei, he also played at the 2008 East Asian Football Championship.

Goals for senior national team

References

External links
 

1987 births
Living people
North Korean footballers
North Korea international footballers
2010 FIFA World Cup players
April 25 Sports Club players
Asian Young Footballer of the Year winners
Footballers at the 2010 Asian Games

Association football forwards
Asian Games competitors for North Korea